The Oberliga Rheinland-Pfalz/Saar, formerly the Oberliga Südwest, is the highest regional football league for the Rhineland-Palatinate and Saarland states of Germany, organized by the Southwestern Regional Football Association. It is the fifth tier of the German football league system. It is one of fourteen Oberligas in German football, the fifth tier of the German football league system. Until the introduction of the 3. Liga in 2008 it was the fourth tier of the league system; before the introduction of the Regionalligas in 1994 the third tier.

From January 1946 up until the creation of the Bundesliga in 1963, the Oberliga Südwest was one of the five highest divisions in Germany. The current league originates from 1978.

History
The Oberliga Rheinland-Pfalz/Saar is one of fourteen Oberligas in Germany. The league is a combination of the regional Rhineland, Saarland and Southwest Football Associations, the next league up is Regionalliga Südwest. It was formed in 1978 out of the top teams of the Amateurligas Rheinland, Saarland and Südwest. Until 2008, when the 3. Liga was introduced, the Oberliga was the fourth tier of the league system.

From 2012 onwards, the league became a feeder league to the new Regionalliga Südwest, together with the Hessenliga and the Oberliga Baden-Württemberg. The previous league the Oberliga Südwest was set below at, the Regionalliga West, from then on only accommodate clubs from Northrhine-Westphalia.

At the end of the 2011–12 season the league was also renamed from Oberliga Südwest to Oberliga Rheinland-Pfalz/Saar, with Oddset being the official name sponsor of the league.

Rules
Nominally 18 teams compete for the Oberliga Rheinland-Pfalz/Saar title. Teams play each other twice, once at home and once away. At the end of the season the champion used to be promoted into either the Regionalliga Süd or the Regionalliga Nord, later the Regionalliga West, depending on their geographical location. From 2008, the league winner was promoted to the Regionalliga West. In the 2007–08 season, the teams finishing from 2nd to 4th were also be promoted.

If the team that wins the league or is on a promotion spot at the end of the season fails to have the correct license then the team who finishes next would be promoted instead of them.

Teams promoted to the new Regionalliga in 2008:
 1. FSV Mainz 05 II
 1. FC Kaiserslautern II
 Wormatia Worms
 Eintracht Trier

Promotion
The winner of the Oberliga Südwest was originally directly promoted to the 2nd Bundesliga Süd. After introduction of the unified 2nd Bundesliga in 1981, the champion had to take part in a promotion play-off. With the introduction of the Regionalliga in 1994 the league winners were again directly promoted. However, this league was demoted to fourth tier of German football after 2008.

Relegation
The bottom three clubs of the Oberliga will be relegated to the Verbandsliga of their football association (Verband). These are:
Verbandsliga Südwest
Saarlandliga
Rheinlandliga

In turn, the Verbandsliga champions will gain entry to the Oberliga. In more recent history the runners-up of the three Verbandsligas were given the opportunity to compete in a promotion round for one more spot in the Oberliga in the following season.

Previous winners
The league champions:

League placings

The complete list of clubs and placings in the league while operating as the tier five Oberliga Rheinland-Pfalz/Saar and feeding the Regionalliga Südwest (2012–present):

Key

References

Sources
 Deutschlands Fußball in Zahlen,  An annual publication with tables and results from the Bundesliga to Verbandsliga/Landesliga. DSFS.
 Kicker Almanach,  The yearbook on German football from Bundesliga to Oberliga, since 1937. Kicker Sports Magazine.
 Süddeutschlands Fußballgeschichte in Tabellenform 1897-1988  History of Southern German football in tables, by Ludolf Hyll
 Die Deutsche Liga-Chronik 1945-2005  History of German football from 1945 to 2005 in tables. DSFS. 2006.

External links 
 Das deutsche Fussball Archiv  Historic German league tables
 Weltfussball.de  Round-by-round results and tables of the Oberliga Südwest from 1994 onwards
 The Southwest Football Association (SWFV) 

 
Rhein
Football competitions in Rhineland-Palatinate
Football competitions in Saarland
1978 establishments in Germany